The 2019 National Hurling League is the 88th season of the National Hurling League for county teams.

Kilkenny were the defending champions, having won the 2018 league.

The GAA announced a new broadcast agreement on 10 January 2019 that runs from 2019 until 2022. Eir Sport and RTÉ provide live TV coverage of the league on Saturday nights. TG4 broadcast Sunday afternoon games. The highlights programmes are RTÉ2's League Sunday on Sunday evenings, TG4's GAA 2019 on Monday evenings and Eir Sport's Allianz Leagues Reloaded on Wednesday evenings.

Limerick won their first league title since 1997 after a 1-24 to 0-19 win against Waterford in the final on 31 March.

Redistribution of the top 12 teams for 2020

In November 2018, the GAA's Central Council decided to reorganise Divisions 1A and 1B before the start of the 2020 National Hurling League. As a result there was no relegation from 1A to 1B in 2019.

In 2019 the teams ranked 1 to 6 competed in Division 1A and the teams ranked 7 to 12 competed in Division 1B. Following the 2019 League the top twelve teams were redistributed into two groups of approximately equal strength. The two new groups were based on their finishing positions in 2019 and were expected to be redrawn after two years.

On completion of the five rounds on 10 March 2019 and a playoff on 16 March 2019, the two groups in 2020's Division 1 were determined as –

2020 Division 1 Group A
Limerick
Tipperary
Cork (winners of 5th v 6th Division 1A playoff in 2019)
Waterford
Galway
Westmeath

2020 Division 1 Group B
Wexford
Clare
Kilkenny (losers of 5th v 6th Division 1A playoff in 2019)
Dublin
Laois
Carlow

GAA President John Horan was of the opinion that the new Division 1 group structure would give managers "an opportunity to actually play players in a developmental manner" as team selections and tactics are likely to be more experimental if the teams do not have to avoid relegation.

Competition format

League structure

Thirty-five teams compete in the 2019 NHL – six teams in the top five divisions (Divisions 1A, 1B, 2A, 2B, 3A) and five teams in Division 3B. All thirty-two county teams from Ireland take part. London, Lancashire and Warwickshire complete the lineup.

Each team plays all the other teams in their division once, either home or away. Two points are awarded for a win, and one for a draw.

The Division 1 hurling quarter-finals and semi-finals will finish on the day the games are played. If a quarter-final or semi-final is level after the initial seventy minutes, still level after two ten minute periods of extra time played each way, and still level after two further five minute periods of extra time, the outcome will be decided by a free-taking competition. This means the winner of quarter-finals and semi-finals will determined without requiring a replay and allow the league finals to be held on the scheduled date.

Tie-breaker
 If only two teams are level on league points, the team that won the head-to-head match is ranked ahead. If this game was a draw, score difference (total scored minus total conceded in all games) is used to rank the teams.
 If three or more teams are level on league points, score difference is used to rank the teams.

Finals, promotions and relegations

Division 1A
 The top four teams qualify for the Division 1 quarter-finals
 No relegation
Division 1B
 The top four teams qualify for the Division 1 quarter-finals
 The bottom two teams meet in a relegation play-off, with the losers being relegated to Division 2A
Division 2A
 The top two teams meet in Division 2A final, with the winners being promoted to Division 1
 The bottom team is relegated to Division 2B
Division 2B
 The top two teams meet in Division 2B final, with the winners being promoted to Division 2A
 The bottom two teams meet in a relegation play-off, with the losers being relegated to Division 3A
Division 3A
 The top two teams meet in Division 3A final, with the winners being promoted to Division 2B
 The bottom team is relegated to Division 3B
Division 3B
 The top two teams meet in Division 3B final, with the winners being promoted to Division 3A

Division 1A

Division 1 Format

In 2019 the 12 teams in Division 1 were organised into two further divisions - teams ranked one to six in Division 1A and teams ranked seven to twelve in Division 1B. In 2020 the twelve top teams were redistributed into two divisions of approximately equal strength which were expected to be redrawn every two years.

Each team played all the other teams in their group once. Two points were awarded for a win and one for a draw. The top four teams in both 1A and 1B advanced to the league quarter-finals with the top team in 1A playing the fourth team in 1B, the second team in 1A playing the third in 1B, etc. Two semi-finals and a final followed.

Division 1A

For official fixtures and results see National Hurling League Division 1A at gaa.ie

Division 1A Table

Division 1A Rounds 1 to 5

Division 1A Round 1

Division 1A Round 2

Division 1A Round 3

Division 1A Round 4

Division 1A Round 5

Division 1B

Division 1B Table

Division 1B Rounds 1 to 5 

For official fixtures and results see National Hurling League Division 1B at gaa.ie

Division 1B Round 1

Division 1B Round 2

Division 1B Round 3

Division 1B Round 4

Division 1B Round 5

Division 1 Knockout

For official fixtures and results see National Hurling League Division 1 at gaa.ie

Division 1 Quarter-Finals 

The hurling quarter-finals finish on the day the games are played, avoiding the need for replays. If the score is level after the initial seventy minutes, still level after two ten minute periods of extra time played each way, and still level after a further two five minute periods of extra time, a free-taking competition is held. Each team nominates five players to take frees from their chosen position on a sixty five metre line selected by the referee and without defenders. The nominated players from each team take alternate turns. If the teams score an equal number of the five frees, the outcome of the match is decided by sudden death frees using the same nominated players in the same order.

The fixtures are 1st in Division 1A plays 4th in Division 1B, 2nd in Division 1A plays 3rd in Division 1B, etc. Home advantage is decided by whichever team has played fewer home games in their five league games, with a coin toss taking place if the number of home games played is the same for both teams.

Division 1 Semi-Finals 

The hurling semi-finals finish on the day the games are played, avoiding the need for replays. If the score is level after the initial seventy minutes, still level after two ten minute periods of extra time played each way, and still level after a further two five minute periods of extra time, a free-taking competition is held. Each team nominates five players to take frees from their chosen position on a sixty five metre line selected by the referee and without defenders. The nominated players from each team take alternate turns. If the teams score an equal number of the five frees, the outcome of the match is decided by sudden death frees using the same nominated players in the same order.

Division 1 Final 

The final was postponed from 24 March to 31 March 2019 as three of the round five fixtures were called off due to bad weather on the weekend of 2–3 March.

Division 1A play-off

This playoff between the teams ranked 5th and 6th in 2019's Division 1A was used to determine which of the two groups the teams were allocated to in 2020's restructured Division 1. Brian Cody, the Kilkenny manager, described it as "a futile match really".

Division 1B relegation play-off

Division 1 scoring statistics

Top scorers overall

Top scorers in a single game

Division 2A

Division 2A Table

Division 2A Rounds 1 to 5

For official fixtures and results see National Hurling League Division 2A at gaa.ie

Division 2A Round 1

Division 2A Round 2

Division 2A Round 3

Division 2A Round 4

Division 2A Round 5

Division 2A Final

Division 2A relegation play-off

Division 2A scoring statistics

Top scorers overall

Top scorers in a single game

Division 2B

Division 2B Table

Division 2B Rounds 1 to 5

For official fixtures and results see National Hurling League Division 2B at gaa.ie

Division 2B Round 1

Division 2B Round 2

Division 2B Round 3

Division 2B Round 4

Division 2B Round 5

Division 2B Final

Division 2B relegation play-off

Division 2B scoring statistics

Top scorers overall

Top scorers in a single game

Division 3A

Division 3A Table

Division 3A Rounds 1 to 5

For official fixtures and results see National Hurling League Division 3A at gaa.ie

Division 3A Round 1

Division 3A Round 2

Division 3A Round 3

Division 3A Round 4

Division 3A Round 5

Division 3A Final

Division 3B

Division 3B Table

Division 3B Rounds 1 to 5

For official fixtures and results see National Hurling League Division 3B at gaa.ie

Division 3B Round 1

Division 3B Round 2

Division 3B Round 3

Division 3B Round 4

Division 3B Round 5

Division 3B Final

References

External links
Full Fixtures and Results

 
National Hurling League seasons